Samworth may refer to:

Samworth Brothers, English food manufacturing company
Samworth Enterprise Academy, school in Leicester, England

People with the surname
Richard Samworth (born 1978), English statistician